Albert Edward Mallalieu (13 January 1904 – March 1991) was an English cricketer. Mallalieu was a right-handed batsman.  He was born in Delph, Saddleworth, Yorkshire.

Malalieu his first-class debut for Wales against Scotland in 1924.  He made five further first-class appearances for Wales, the last of which came against the Marylebone Cricket Club in 1930.  In his six first-class appearances, he scored 137 runs at an average of 17.12, with a high score of 66.  His score, his only first-class fifty, came against Ireland in 1925.

He died in March 1991 in Huddersfield, Yorkshire.

References

External links
Albert Mallalieu at ESPNcricinfo
Albert Mallalieu at CricketArchive

1904 births
1991 deaths
People from Saddleworth
English cricketers
Wales cricketers
Sportspeople from Yorkshire